Kevena Suen Reid (born 18 September 1998) is a Jamaican footballer who plays as a forward for the Jamaica women's national team.

International goals
Scores and results list Jamaica's goal tally first

References

External links 
 

1998 births
Living people
Jamaican women's footballers
Women's association football midfielders
Women's association football forwards
Maccabi Kishronot Hadera F.C. players
Ligat Nashim players
Jamaica women's international footballers
Jamaican expatriate women's footballers
Jamaican expatriate sportspeople in Israel
Expatriate women's footballers in Israel